Sheriff Won't Shoot  is a 1965 Italian and Spanish Spaghetti Western film.

Cast 

 Mickey Hargitay as Allan
 Vincenzo Cascino as Barone Vermont (as Vincent Cashino)
 Dan Clark
 Aïché Nana as Desiree (as Aichè Nanà)
 Pilar Clemens
 Ángel Ter
 Sancho Gracia
 Gianni Dei as Stephen
 Antonio Devi (as Anthony Devi)
 German Grech
 Victor Kasline
 Marco Mariani as Jim
 Solvi Stubing as Rita
 José Luis Zalde
 Manuel Zarzo as Brett

External links
 

1965 films
1960s Italian-language films
Spaghetti Western films
Spanish Western (genre) films
Italian Western (genre) films
1965 Western (genre) films
1960s Italian films